Yamit Fabricio Gironza Montenegro (born 19 August 2000) is a Colombian badminton player.

Achievements

BWF International Challenge/Series
Mixed Doubles

 BWF International Challenge tournament
 BWF International Series tournament
 BWF Future Series tournament

References

External links
 

2000 births
Living people
Colombian male badminton players
21st-century Colombian people